LG eXpo (GW820) also known as LG GW820 is a projector-enabled mobile phone designed for business users, and manufactured by LG Electronics. It runs Microsoft's Windows Mobile operating system, and was released in December 2009.

The phone features a 3.2 inch resistive screen, which is operated by holding a stylus pen. It boasts a crisp screen with pixel density of 291.5 ppi (diagonal) which is very close to with iPhone 4's retina display at 329.6 ppi (diagonal). It has a fingerprint sensor which acts as D-pad and omits the need to input password as well as instil extra security for business users.  The stylus is stored externally, in a cylindrical container with a cap. It is the first mobile phone to feature a handheld projector.

References

External links

LG eXpo Official Site by AT&T
LG eXpo Picture
LG eXpo Press Release
LG eXpo Review by Gizmodo
LG eXpo Forum
cnet review on LG eXpo

LG Electronics smartphones
Mobile phones introduced in 2009
Mobile phones with an integrated hardware keyboard